Dichrorampha nigrobrunneana is a moth belonging to the family Tortricidae first described by Toll in 1942.

References

Grapholitini